Agila-Manila Soccer Academy Football Club is a Filipino association football club which played in the former United Football League, which was the highest level of club football in the Philippines. The club is composed of former and current players from the Ateneo men's football team.

Kit manufacturers and shirt sponsors

References

Football clubs in the Philippines
2000 establishments in the Philippines
Sports teams in Metro Manila